The Nuba Relief, Rehabilitation and Development Organisation (NRRDO) is a Sudanese humanitarian organization, the "best-known development organisation" of the Nuba people. Established in 1993 with the involvement of Yousif Kuwa, the NRRDO provides the people of the Nuba Mountains with food, cooking oil, clothing and education.

The NRRDO has its headquarters in Nairobi. NRRDO executive directors have included Neroun Phillip, Najwa Musa Konda and Ali Abdelrahman.

References

External links
 NRRDO

Humanitarian aid organizations
Organisations based in Nairobi
1993 establishments in Sudan
Organizations established in 1993
South Kordofan